Yam ring, also known as yam basket, taro basket or prosperity basket, is a Singaporean dish consisting of a deep-fried ring of mashed taro filled with separately stir-fried ingredients. Originally a vegetarian dish, it is now commonly served with chicken or seafood, and a staple at tze char restaurant.

History
The dish is commonly credited to Hooi Kok Wai, the founder of the Dragon Phoenix Restaurant in Singapore and one of the "Four Heavenly Kings of Cantonese Cuisine" in the 1960s, chefs who cook Cantonese–style dishes with local Singaporean ingredients in Singapore.

According to the legend, Chef Hooi invented the dish in 1958 to impress the vegetarian nuns who had brought up his orphaned wife to be, Leong Ah Lin. The shape of the dish also resembles the alms bowl used by Buddhist monks, leading to its Chinese name, which literally translates as "fragrant Buddha bowl".

Lai Wah Restaurant, set up by two other Heavenly Kings, also claims credit for inventing the dish.

See also
 Taro dumpling
 Singaporean cuisine

References

Singaporean cuisine
Cantonese cuisine